Wesley Powell (October 13, 1915January 6, 1981) was an American lawyer and Republican politician from Hampton Falls, New Hampshire.

Powell was born in Portsmouth, New Hampshire. He attended schools in Portsmouth before graduating from the University of New Hampshire.  He received his law degree from the Southern Methodist College of Law in 1940.

He served in the U.S. Army Air Corps in World War II and practiced law in Manchester before his tenure as the 70th governor of New Hampshire from 1959 to 1963.

Powell ran for renomination in 1962, he was defeated in the Primary by John Pillsbury who lost the general election to John W. King. Powell made unsuccessful bids for the governorship in 1964, and 1978, and The U. S. Senate in 1966 and 1972. Powell died of natural causes on January 6, 1981, at the age of 65.

Memorials
A street in Hampton Falls is named Governor Powell Drive.

References

|-

|-

|-

1915 births
1981 deaths
20th-century American politicians
American people of Welsh descent
Republican Party governors of New Hampshire
Politicians from Manchester, New Hampshire
Military personnel from New Hampshire
Dedman School of Law alumni
University of New Hampshire alumni
New Hampshire lawyers